(AJPW/AJP) or simply All Japan is a Japanese professional wrestling promotion established on October 21, 1972 when Giant Baba split away from the Japanese Wrestling Association and created his own promotion. Many wrestlers had left with Baba, with many more joining the following year when JWA folded. From the mid-1970s, All Japan was firmly established as the largest promotion in Japan. As the 1990s began, aging stars gave way to a younger generation including Mitsuharu Misawa, "Dr. Death" Steve Williams, Kenta Kobashi, Gary Albright, Toshiaki Kawada, Mike Barton (Bart Gunn), Akira Taue and Jun Akiyama, leading to perhaps AJPW's most profitable period in the 1990s.

In 1999, Giant Baba died and the promotion was run by Motoko Baba. Misawa was named President but left in 2000 after disagreements with Motoko. Misawa created Pro Wrestling NOAH and every single native wrestler besides Masanobu Fuchi and Toshiaki Kawada left All Japan. This led to a loss of All Japan's TV deal and a period of hardship for the company. In 2001, they entered a cross-promotion agreement with New Japan Pro-Wrestling which proved very successful, allowing All Japan to remain one of the larger promotions in the country, although now firmly behind NJPW.

In January 2002, Keiji Muto defected to All Japan, and was officially appointed as its new president that September. He would then acquire the rights to the company and Baba family stock by early 2003, when another exodus of gaijin wrestlers began, most notably Steve Williams, KroniK, Bill Goldberg and Mike Rotunda.

By mid-2005, All Japan's attendance had dropped and the promotion seemed to be in trouble again but by 2007 had new sponsors and seemed to have recovered. After Misawa and most of the other wrestlers left the promotion, there was a lull in developing new stars until the likes of KAI, Suwama, Hama and T28 debuted from the mid-2000s onward and helped restrengthen the company.

With established stars such as Keiji Mutoh, Satoshi Kojima, John "Earthquake" Tenta, Masakatsu Funaki, D'Lo Brown and Minoru Suzuki anchoring the promotion, the younger wrestlers were given time to grow and by 2010 were set to help lead All Japan. While still without a great TV deal, All Japan has operated consistently since 1972, making it the second-longest running promotion in Japan.

History

All Japan under Giant Baba (1972–1999)

NWA membership 

The promotion was founded by Shohei "Giant" Baba and the Momota brothers, Mitsuo and Yoshihiro, sons of Rikidōzan. Baba, a former professional baseball pitcher, joined the Japan Pro Wrestling Alliance (JWA) in 1960. In October 1972, he left the JWA and formed his own group, All Japan. Their first card was on October 21, 1972, at Machida City Gym in Tokyo, Japan. The inaugural roster included Baba, Mitsuo Momota, Akio Sato, Samson Kutsuwada, Motoshi Okuma and Mashio Koma. Thunder Sugiyama, who had recently left International Wrestling Enterprise, also came along to help and brought some lower-level IWE wrestlers with him on a freelance basis. Some personalities from North America also helped with the few cards, including Dory Funk Sr., Terry Funk, Bruno Sammartino, Dominic DeNucci, Freddie Blassie and The Destroyer.

Baba established the Pacific Wrestling Federation (PWF) as the governing body for all future titles in All Japan. In the beginning the PWF recognized a world heavyweight championship and several "regional championships" given as billing to foreign stars depending from which region they came from, but after All Japan joined the National Wrestling Alliance (NWA), the PWF world title was downgraded to a regional championship. The first PWF Chairman, who presented the belts to the winners in title bouts, was Lord James Blears. As a loyal member of the NWA, All Japan enjoyed the ability to bring in foreigners, and the NWA World Heavyweight Championship was frequently defended. In the beginning Baba continued the Japanese vs. foreigner formula for the championships, but gradually Dory Funk Jr. and his brother Terry Funk, as well as Mil Máscaras from Mexico became fan favorites when wrestling other foreigners and subsequently one of the few foreign wrestlers to become icons in Japan.

Separation from the NWA, new stars and company growth 

When the NWA territorial system collapsed in the late 1980s and early 1990s, Baba distanced himself from other promoters at home and abroad, and began a system of promoting talent (both Japanese and foreign) who competed exclusively for his promotion. With the unification of the titles in All Japan into the Triple Crown Heavyweight and the World Tag Team Championship, as well as the promotion of talent including Jumbo Tsuruta, Genichiro Tenryu, Akira Taue, Mitsuharu Misawa, Toshiaki Kawada and Kenta Kobashi, the promotion was able to carve a loyal fanbase that lasted during the 1990s. Interpromotional matches were rare, and wrestlers who arrived from other Japanese promotions (such as Hiroshi Hase, Shigeo Okumura and Yoshihiro Takayama) were not given pushes, but in Hase's case, it was voluntarily, due to his primary involvement with the House of Councillors.

Gaijins who signed with AJPW full-time were given pushes regardless of which promotion they arrived, most notably Stan Hansen, "Dr. Death" Steve Williams, Gary Albright, Vader and Mike Barton.

All Japan would achieve its third best-selling attendance with an attendance of 58,300 in the Tokyo Dome on the May 1, 1998 pay-per-view, having seen consistent growth since 1992. On the March 4, 1992 pay-per-view All Japan sold out the Nippon Budokan for the first time, with an attendance of 16,300.

All Japan's highest-selling show was the Giant Baba Memorial pay-per-view on May 2, 1999, which sold out the Tokyo Dome with an attendance of 65,000. The January 28, 2001 pay-per-view was All Japan's second highest attendance of all time at 58,700, which was notable for Stan Hansen's retirement and the Steve Williams vs. Mike Barton Brawl For All revenge angle. The last two matches of the card featuring Keiji Muto vs. Taiyō Kea, as well as the main event tag-team match, did not appear on the initial television broadcast in 2001, the original broadcast instead ending with Williams finally getting his redemption and defeating Barton in the main event.

First exodus: Super World Sports 
In April 1990, Genichiro Tenryu led the first exodus of wrestlers (The Great Kabuki, Samson Fuyuki, Tatsumi Kitahara, Masao Orihara, Yoshiaki Yatsu, Goro Tsurumi, and Shinichi Nakano) lured as they were to form Super World of Sports, which enabled Baba to push Misawa, Kawada, Taue and Kobashi to be his new stars.

All Japan under Mitsuharu Misawa (1999–2000) 
With the death of Shohei "Giant" Baba on January 31, 1999, top star Mitsuharu Misawa immediately inherited the position of company president. On May 28, 2000, Misawa was removed from his position by a majority vote of the executive board. At a regular All Japan board meeting on June 13, 2000, Misawa, Mitsuo Momota (co-vice president, member of directory), Kenta Kobashi (member of directory), Akira Taue (member of directory, chairman), Kenichi Oyagi (member of directory) and Yoshihiro Momota (member of directory) resigned from their board positions. A day later, Motoko Baba ("Mrs. Baba") released a two-page written statement, which claimed that Misawa "took no responsibility and abandoned his duty."  In addition, she hinted that Toshiaki Kawada and Masanobu Fuchi would be the only two native wrestlers to stay with All Japan, as "Kawada and Fuchi have sworn to carry out Baba-san's last wish: to keep All Japan Pro Wrestling alive"; this was confirmed a day later when Kawada and Fuchi both renewed their contracts with All Japan, along with referee Kyohei Wada. The gaijin wrestlers that chose to stay with AJPW were Maunakea Mossman, Johnny Smith, George Hines, Mike Barton, Jim Steele, Mike Rotunda, Stan Hansen and "Dr. Death" Steve Williams, while Scorpio, Vader and Richard Slinger joined Misawa's crew. Not wanting to choose sides, Johnny Ace would retire from active competition and return to World Championship Wrestling in the United States as a road agent.

Second exodus: Pro Wrestling Noah 

On June 16, 2000, 24 out of the 26 contracted native wrestlers for All Japan were led by Misawa for a press conference, where it was announced that they would be leaving the promotion; more than 100 reporters and photographers attended, and Misawa expressed his wish for the promotion to debut in August, with the Differ Ariake being the site of the unnamed promotion's debut. When asked what his reason for leaving All Japan is, Misawa claimed that it was so he could do things in a "modern style." A day later, Misawa announced the promotion's name: Pro Wrestling Noah, which was inspired by the Biblical story where Noah built an ark and put two of every kind of animal in the world in the ark before God destroyed the world.

On June 19, 2000, it was confirmed (at a press conference at All-Japan's dojo held by Toshiaki Kawada and Masanobu Fuchi) that NTV decided to discontinue broadcasting All Japan after 27 years; however, NTV maintained their 15% stock in All Japan (as Motoko Baba held the remaining 85%), and would prevent All Japan from being put on another network. On June 20, twelve All Japan office employees resigned from their positions with the promotion, with intentions to follow Misawa to Noah. NTV also announced that they will carry weekly tapings of Misawa's Noah promotion, with the title of the program being called "Colosseo." Noah took All Japan's 30-minute timeslot on Sundays at midnight. Misawa was interviewed in Tokyo on June 21, where he announced that he and the other wrestlers leaving to form Noah would compete on four of the sixteen shows in All Japan's Summer Action Series 2000 tour, which began on July 1. NTV also aired the final All Japan TV show on the network, which aired for 45 minutes and featured footage from Jumbo Tsuruta's funeral, the Noah wrestlers' press conference from June 16, Kawada's press conference from June 19, highlights of the first ever Kawada vs. Misawa Triple Crown Heavyweight Championship match from October 21, 1992, and Toshiaki Kawada and Akira Taue vs. Yoshihiro Takayama and Takao Omori for the World Tag Team Championship from All Japan's Nippon Budokan show from June 9.

On June 28, 2000, Misawa formally announced at a press conference that Pro Wrestling Noah would debut with two consecutive shows (titled "Departure") in Differ Ariake on August 5 and 6 in Tokyo.

Rebuilding 
On July 2 in the Korakuen Hall, Motoko Baba announced the unfathomable return of Genichiro Tenryu (as Giant Baba publicly swore that he would never be allowed back in All Japan, following a departure in 1990 to form the Super World of Sports), as he would team with Kawada to face Maunnakea Mossman and Stan Hansen on July 23 (at the final tour show). On July 20, 2000, Yoshinobu Kanemaru, Takeshi Morishima, Naomichi Marufuji, Kentaro Shiga, Takeshi Rikio, Mitsuo Momota, Rusher Kimura, Haruka Eigen, Tsuyoshi Kikuchi, Kenta Kobayashi, Takao Omori, Yoshihiro Takayama, Jun Izumida, Masao Inoue, Yoshinari Ogawa, Akira Taue, Jun Akiyama and Mitsuharu Misawa competed in their last matches for All Japan Pro Wrestling at the sold out Hakata Star Lane in Fukuoka. After the show, "Dr. Death" Steve Williams came out and shook Misawa's hand, and requested one last singles match between the two. However, Misawa returned to the bus immediately after his match, not staying for the last two matches of the show. Every one of All Japan's titles were vacated due to the departure of the aforementioned wrestlers and title holders. Mrs. Baba appointed Stan Hansen as the new Chairman of All Japan's Pacific Wrestling Federation title governing body, replacing Lord James Blears.

Interpromotional feud against New Japan (2000–2002) 
On August 10, 2000, All Japan mainstay Masanobu Fuchi walked into the New Japan Pro-Wrestling ring and declared that his intention was to "break down the walls" between All Japan and New Japan. In response, New Japan foreman Riki Choshu rushed into the ring and exchanged a firm handshake with Fuchi, signaling the beginning of the cross-promotional alliance. On September 16, 2000, Toshiaki Kawada followed Fuchi's path and vowed to crush New Japan ace Kensuke Sasaki, as he defeated Sasaki in the Tokyo Dome on October 9, 2000; the event sold out the building. In 2001, Keiji Mutoh and Shinjiro Otani created the interpromotional stable BATT (Bad Ass Translate Trading), which included All Japan's Taiyō Kea, Michinoku Pro's Jinsei Shinzaki and Hiroshi Hase. During this time, Mutoh challenged and defeated Tenryu for the Triple Crown Heavyweight Championship, as well as capturing the World Tag Team Championship with Taiyō Kea. The alliance between the promotions lasted until January 11, 2002.

All Japan under Keiji Mutoh: Pro Wrestling Love era (2002–2013) 

Signs of what would become the Pro Wrestling Love era would be seen in the spring and summer of 2001, when Keiji Mutoh, as a member of New Japan Pro-Wrestling, made part-time appearances to All Japan, fighting Toshiaki Kawada and "Dr. Death" Steve Williams in major singles matches on pay-per-view. A notable shift in the product was seen in July 2001, when in a pay-per-view main event, Steve Williams lost to Keiji Mutoh for the Triple Crown Heavyweight Championship, where it ended in an altercation. After leaving the backstage area Williams would then going on a huge swearing tirade, where he kicked a trash can, was about to cry in tears, and then throwing his armpads to the ground while swearing again. Such scenes never happened in the traditional All Japan and was characteristic to the "crash TV" style of Vince Russo's writing.

On January 11, 2002, following the end of a year-long cross-promotional angle with New Japan Pro-Wrestling, Keiji Mutoh shocked the Japanese wrestling world by defecting to All-Japan as a full-time competitor, taking Satoshi Kojima and Kendo Kashin with him. This is considered the official start of the era. Keiji Mutoh would lose to Steve Williams in a grudge feud in March 2002, but a month later Mutoh defeated Mike Barton in the 2002 Championship Carnival tournament main-event. Despite Barton's loss, he and Jim Steele would find success in winning the Stan Hansen cup in July 2002, Barton also being able to prevent Williams from winning.

On September 30, 2002, during an All Japan 30th Anniversary party at the famed Tokyo City Hotel, Mrs. Baba officially announced Mutoh's appointment as the new president of All Japan, transferring all of the Baba family stock to him. Mrs. Baba's last on-screen appearance was on the October 27, 2002 pay-per-view, before leaving All Japan altogether by January 2003. Mutoh upheld some traditional aspects of the Baba-run All Japan, as the Champion Carnival and World's Strongest Tag Determination League remained annual events.

During this time, AJPW was struggling financially and Muto had to borrow money from Mrs. Baba as of November 28, 2002. This led to rumors that Muto was going to sell the company to Fuji TV by the time of the next WRESTLE-1 pay-per-view, which ultimately did not happen. Instead, the rights to AJPW would go to Gaora TV with AJPW still operating in its usual corporate manner led by Keiji Muto, rarely broadcasting pay-per-views to SKY PerfecTV! and SAMURAI TV. Gaora TV would oversee AJPW's production and would buy the majority of the tape library post-2003, where they upload several segments to their official Youtube channel.

In January 2003, a third exodus began, primarily of gaijin wrestlers. The most notable included "Dr. Death" Steve Williams, KroniK, Bill Goldberg and Mike Rotunda. They had wrestled their last matches on pay-per-views that month, not renewing their contracts after the new ownership fully realized. Williams would only make one more appearance in the Pro Wrestling Love era on a July 22, 2004 pay-per-view, who at the time was going through throat cancer recovery and made a surprise appearance. Throughout 2003 and 2004, recent debuts like John "Earthquake" Tenta, Bull Buchanan, Jamal (Umaga), D'Lo Brown and Gigantes (Jerry Tuite) would become the main gaijins.

Some interpromotional activities that would not have happened under Shohei Baba's watch have taken place, including the previously unfathomable IWGP Heavyweight Champion vs. Triple Crown Heavyweight Champion bout on a New Japan Pro-Wrestling event on February 20, 2005; Satoshi Kojima (who was the Triple Crown Heavyweight Champion) defeated Hiroyoshi Tenzan for the IWGP Heavyweight Championship, which made Kojima the only wrestler to ever hold both titles simultaneously to that point (Keiji Mutoh would later accomplish the feat in 2008. However, he would hold the IWGP Championship as Keiji Mutoh, and the Triple Crown Championship as his alter-ego The Great Muta) In addition, Keiji Mutoh and Satoshi Kojima are both New Japan Pro-Wrestling alumni but played a consistent role in the main event picture of All Japan Pro Wrestling from the time of their arrival to the promotion. Furthermore, Keiji Mutoh competed at a Pro Wrestling Noah event on July 10, 2004, teaming with fellow AJPW wrestler Taiyō Kea to face Mitsuharu Misawa and Yoshinari Ogawa. On July 18, 2004, Mitsuharu Misawa returned to All Japan and defeated Satoshi Kojima at Battle Banquet. Misawa returned to All Japan again on October 31, 2004, for the Keiji Mutoh: Love and Bump pay-per-view event, where he (along with Keiji Mutoh) defeated Hiroshi Hase and Kensuke Sasaki in what was billed as a "Special Dream Tag Match".

On July 10, 2007, Hiroshi Hase was appointed as the new Chairman of the Pacific Wrestling Federation, following Stan Hansen's voluntary resignation. Hase is the third chairman in PWF's history. Joe Doering would become the main gaijin around this time.

October 12, 2007 Baseball Magazine Sha, the publisher of Puroresu Shukan released AJPW trading cards.

On June 7, 2011, Keiji Mutoh announced his resignation as the President of All Japan Pro Wrestling and named Masayuki Uchida as his successor.

On August 28, 2012, AJPW and Gaora TV announced that AJPW would introduce a new championship called the Gaora TV Championship. The tournament for the title began on September 8, and ended on October 7 with Seiya Sanada defeating Yasufumi Nakanoue in the final to become the inaugural champion.

The "Pro Wrestling Love" name and theme was retired on July 5, 2013, thus ending the era.

All Japan under Nobuo Shiraishi (2012–2014) 
On November 1, 2012, IT company Speed Partners purchased all shares of All Japan from Keiji Mutoh and his business partners for ¥200 million, however, the purchase was not made public until February 2013. In January 2013, AJPW signed Atsushi Aoki, Go Shiozaki, Jun Akiyama, Kotaro Suzuki and Yoshinobu Kanemaru, all of whom had quit Pro Wrestling Noah the previous month, to return to AJPW, initially as freelancers. On March 17, 2013, it was announced that Hiroshi Hase was stepping down as Pacific Wrestling Federation Chairman, and that he would be succeeded by Kenta Kobashi, following Kobashi's retirement as a professional wrestler on May 11, 2013.

Fourth exodus: Wrestle-1 
On May 1, 2013, it was reported that negotiations had started between Speed Partners president Nobuo Shiraishi and All Japan president Masayuki Uchida, which would see Keiji Mutoh regain the promotion's presidency before the end of the month. However, on May 27, it was reported that Shiraishi himself would take over the presidency of All Japan effective June 1. This was later confirmed by All Japan, and led to Keiji Mutoh's resignation from the promotion. In the weeks that followed, Masakatsu Funaki, Kaz Hayashi, Shuji Kondo, Ryota Hama, Masayuki Kono, Hiroshi Yamato, Koji Kanemoto, Minoru Tanaka, Yasufumi Nakanoue, Kai, Seiya Sanada and Andy Wu announced their resignation from the promotion out of loyalty to Mutoh.

They all left the promotion following a June 30 event in Ryōgoku Kokugikan (the TV taping for the July 5 episode where the Pro Wrestling Love era ended) and went on to form the Wrestle-1 promotion the following month and announced their first show was held September 8 at Tokyo Dome City Hall. At the event, the Gaora TV Champion René Dupree made his debut in Wrestle-1, leaving AJPW. Before the end of the year, Manabu Soya also quit All Japan to jump to Wrestle-1.

Rebuilding 
After the exodus (along with the departures of ring announcer Makoto Abe and referees Daichi Murayama and Daisuke Kanbayashi), the promotion has now been reduced to less than half the active roster. On June 21, 2013, it was revealed that since 2009, AJPW mainstay Masanobu Fuchi, who has been with the promotion since debuting in 1974, had long since resigned from the AJPW Board of Directors and has not been on an exclusive contract due to his age, thus becoming a freelancer, but chose to stay with AJPW on a pay per performance basis. On July 5, 2013, all five members of Burning (Akiyama, Shiozaki, Aoki, Suzuki, and Kanemaru) officially signed exclusive contracts with AJPW, ending their tenure as freelancers, along with the returns of Taiyo Kea and referee Kyohei Wada. On July 14, during the launching event of the post-Mutoh All Japan, Masanobu Fuchi announced that he had officially re-signed with the promotion not only as a wrestler, but also as a member of the Board of Directors, ending his tenure as a freelancer. On August 1, all of the All Japan shares were moved from Speed Partners to Shiraishi's Red Wall Japan corporation, which effectively became the new parent company of the promotion. Meanwhile, the promotion's corporate name was changed to "Zen Nihon Puroresu Systems". On August 7, it was reported that All Japan had agreed to return the NWA International Heavyweight, NWA United National and PWF World Heavyweight Championship belts, which make up the Triple Crown Heavyweight Championship, to Motoko Baba, the widow of the promotion's founder Giant Baba, bringing an end to the final remnant of the Giant Baba All Japan. The Triple Crown Heavyweight Championship retained its old name, but All Japan introduced a new title belt to represent it. The three original belts were defended for the last time on August 25, when Suwama successfully defended them against Go Shiozaki. The new title belt was revealed on October 27. On August 27, Shiraishi announced that he would be stepping down as the All Japan president by the end of the month. He would, however, remain the owner of the promotion. On September 1, longtime freelancer Akebono signed a contract to officially join All Japan full-time. On September 11, Hirota Inoue, one of the executive directors originally brought to the promotion by Shiraishi, was announced as the new president of All Japan. On October 27, Dory Funk, Jr. was announced as the new Pacific Wrestling Federation chairman.

All Japan under Jun Akiyama (2014–2021) 
On June 5, 2014, All Japan announced a corporate restructuring taking place on July 1, which would see Jun Akiyama take over as the promotion's new president. On July 1, the promotion announced another corporate name change to "All Japan Pro Wrestling kabushiki gaisha" (dropping the Japanese "Zen Nihon Puroresu" name), while also relocating its headquarters from Tokyo to Yokohama. Akiyama established a new company named Zen Nihon Puroresu Innovation, through which he will run the new All Japan Pro Wrestling. Akiyama also serves as the representative director of the promotion and reports to a board of directors, which most notably includes Suwama and Akebono. Motoko Baba also joined the promotion as a consultant. On September 28, 2015, Go Shiozaki announced his resignation from All Japan. On November 2, it was announced that Akebono was also leaving All Japan with the goal of returning to mixed martial arts. On November 16, yet another wrestler, the reigning World Junior Heavyweight Champion Kotaro Suzuki, announced his departure from All Japan at the end of the month. Four days later, Yoshinobu Kanemaru also announced he would be leaving All Japan following December 15. Akiyama revealed that the departures were all for the same reason: All Japan had recently decided to change all of its wrestler contracts to pay-per-appearance contracts. In October 2016, the promotion announced it had reached a deal with satellite television provider Nippon BS Broadcasting for a monthly highlights show, Eleven, to be broadcast on the third Monday of each month. On November 27, 2016, the promotion returned to Ryōgoku Kokugikan for its first event at the venue in three years, headlined by Kento Miyahara defending the Triple Crown Heavyweight Championship against Suwama. In August 2017 Toryumon Mexico started working with All Japan Pro Wrestling in with a collaborated event tour called Lucha Fiesta. On February 4, 2018, AJPW announced "All Japan Pro Wrestling TV", a new worldwide streaming site for the promotion's events. On October 10, 2019, Akiyama left his position as President to become General Manager.

Roster and current champions 

 Titles previously promoted by the company include
 Titles that were originally part of the Triple Crown Heavyweight Championship
 NWA International Heavyweight Championship
 NWA United National Championship
 PWF World Heavyweight Championship
 Titles that are now part of the World Tag Team Championship
 NWA International Tag Team Championship
 PWF World Tag Team Championship
 Others
 NWA International Junior Heavyweight Championship (replaced with World Junior Heavyweight Championship)
 PWF All Asia Heavyweight Championship (now promoted by Pro Wrestling Land's End with authorization from Pacific Wrestling Federation)
 PWF United States Heavyweight Championship
 F-1 Tag Team Championship (transferred to and promoted by Wrestle-1 until its closure)

Tournaments 
AJPW also holds annual tournaments to decide the top wrestler or tag team in the promotion:

Broadcasters 
Domestic:

 Gaora (2000–present, broadcasting monthly show B-Banquet and live specials; formerly broadcasting archive show Battle Archives)
 Fighting TV Samurai (2000–present, broadcasting live and taped shows; formerly broadcasting weekly show King's Road and archive show Royal Road Club)
 Nico Nico Douga (2016–present, streaming untelevised spot-shows and interviews)
 Amazon Prime Video Japan (2020–present)
Worldwide:
 All Japan Pro Wrestling TV (streaming service, in partnership with Gaora, broadcasting most AJPW shows live, as well as on-demand)

Former 
 Nippon Television (1972–2000, continues to air AJPW footage unbranded as Wrestling Classics on NTV G+)
 Broadcast syndication, Japanese Association of Independent Television Stations (1994–2013, intermittent weekly programming and specials)
 BS11 (2016–2018, broadcasting highlight/magazine show Eleven)
International (former):
 FITE TV (2017–2018)

See also 

 Professional wrestling in Japan
 List of professional wrestling promotions in Japan

References

External links 

 
 All Japan Pro-Wrestling title histories
 Puroresu.com summary

 
National Wrestling Alliance members
Japanese professional wrestling promotions
1972 establishments in Japan
Entertainment companies established in 1972
Companies based in Yokohama